Peintre is a commune in the Jura department in Franche-Comté in eastern France.

Peintre or Peintres may also refer to:

Peintre Celebre (foaled 1994), thoroughbred racehorse
Peintre-graveur, an artisan who creates original works in engravings
Peintres voyageurs, term designating late 20th century itinerant French artists
Peintre de la Marine, French title bestowed on an artist whose works depict the French Navy
Premier peintre du Roi, French royal post from 1603 to 1791

See also
Painter (disambiguation)